Ibadi (Hangul: 이바디) is a South Korean rock band formed by Fluxus Music in 2008. They debuted on April 3, 2008, with Story Of Us.

Members
 Horan – Vocals
 Geojung – Drums, guitar, production
 Justin Kim – Bass guitar, production

Discography

Studio albums

Extended plays

Soundtrack appearances

References

Musical groups established in 2008
Musical groups from Seoul
2008 establishments in South Korea
South Korean musical trios